Grant Simmons may refer to:

Grant Simmons (basketball) (born 1943), American basketball player
Grant Simmons (footballer) (born 1952), Australian rules footballer